Qebchaq (also Romanized as Qebchāq) is a village in Malard Rural District, in the Central District of Malard County, Tehran Province, Iran. At the 2006 census, its population was 2,010, in 507 families.

References 

Populated places in Malard County